Malachi Favors (August 22, 1927 – January 30, 2004) was an American jazz bassist who played with the Art Ensemble of Chicago.

Biography
"Favors's tendency to dissemble about his age was a well-known source of mirth to fellow musicians of his generation". Most reference works give his year of birth of 1937, but, following his death, his daughter stated that it was 1927.

Favors primarily played the double bass, but also played the electric bass guitar, banjo, zither, gong, and other instruments.  He began playing double bass at the age of 15 and began performing professionally upon graduating from high school. Early performances included work with Dizzy Gillespie and Freddie Hubbard. By 1965, he was a founder of the Association for the Advancement of Creative Musicians and a member of Muhal Richard Abrams' Experimental Band.

At some point he added the word "Maghostut" to his name and because of this he is commonly listed as "Malachi Favors Maghostut". Musically he is most associated with bebop, hard bop, and particularly free jazz.

Favors was a protégé of Chicago bassist Wilbur Ware.  His first known recording was a 1953 session with tenor saxophonist Paul Bascomb.  He made an LP with Chicago pianist Andrew Hill (1957). Favors began working with Roscoe Mitchell in 1966; this group eventually became the Art Ensemble of Chicago.  Favors also worked outside the group, with artists including Sunny Murray, Archie Shepp, and Dewey Redman.

Prominent records include Natural & Spiritual (solo bass, 1978) and Sightsong (duets with Muhal Richard Abrams, 1975). In 1994 he played with Roman Bunka (Oud) at Berlin Jazz Fest and recorded the 'German Critics Poll Winner' album, Color Me Cairo.

Favors died from pancreatic cancer in January 2004, at the age of 76.

Discography

As leader or co-leader
 Natural & Spiritual (AECO, 1978)
 2 x 4 (Southport, 1999) with Tatsu Aoki
 Live at Last (Rogueart, 2006)

With Art Ensemble of Chicago

As sideman
With Ahmed Abdullah
 Liquid Magic (Silkheart, 1987)

With Fred Anderson
 Black Horn Long Gone (Southport, 1993)

With Charles Brackeen
 Bannar (Silkheart, 1987)

With Bright Moments: Joseph Jarman, Kalaparusha Maurice McIntyre, Kahil El'Zabar and Adegoke Steve Colson
 Return of the Lost Tribe (Delmark, 1998)

With Roman Bunka
 Color Me Cairo (Enja, 1995)

With Kahil El'Zabar
 Sacred Love (Sound Aspects, 1985)
 Another Kind of Groove (Sound Aspects, 1986)
 The Ancestors Are Amongst Us (Katalyst Entertainment, 1987)
 Alika Rising at Leverkusener Jazztage (Sound Aspects, 1989)
 Renaissance of the Resistance (Delmark, 1993)
 Big Cliff (Delmark, 1994)
 Jitterbug Junction (CIMP, 1997)
 Conversations (Delmark, 1999) with Archie Shepp
 Africa N'Da Blues (Delmark, 1999) featuring Pharoah Sanders

With Dennis González
 Stefan (Silkheart, 1987)
 Namesake (Silkheart, 1987)

With Andrew Hill
 So in Love (Warwick, 1960)

With Maurice McIntyre
Humility in the Light of the Creator (Delmark, 1969)

With Roscoe Mitchell
 Before There Was Sound (Nessa, 1965; issued 2011)
 Nonaah (Nessa, 1977)
 The Flow of Things (Black Saint, 1986)
 Hey Donald (Delmark, 1995)
 The Day and the Night (Dizim, 1997)

With Sunny Murray
 Sunshine (BYG, 1969)
 Homage to Africa (BYG, 1969)
 An Even Break (Never Give a Sucker) (BYG, 1970)
 Live at Moers Festival (Moers Music, 1979)

With Dewey Redman
 Tarik (BYG, 1969)

With Archie Shepp
 Blasé (BYG, 1969)

With Alan Silva
Luna Surface (BYG, 1969)
Seasons (BYG, 1971)

With Wadada Leo Smith
 Reflectativity (Tzadik, 2000)
 Golden Quartet (Tzadik, 2000)
 The Year of the Elephant (Pi, 2002)

References

External links
 "A Fireside Chat with Malachi Favors", JazzWeekly.com

American jazz bass guitarists
American male bass guitarists
American jazz double-bassists
Male double-bassists
1927 births
2004 deaths
Art Ensemble of Chicago members
Jazz musicians from Illinois
Guitarists from Mississippi
Deaths from cancer in Illinois
Deaths from pancreatic cancer
People from Lexington, Mississippi
20th-century American bass guitarists
Guitarists from Chicago
Jazz musicians from Mississippi
20th-century double-bassists
20th-century American male musicians
American male jazz musicians